Lang Leve... ("Long Live...") is a comical Flemish television program presented in Belgium on vtm by Jonas van Geel. In each episode, a celebrity guest takes his or her place in the "throne" and is roasted by van Geel using a series of acted vignettes about the celebrity's life.

Episodes

References

External links 
http://vtm.be/lang-leve
http://www.demorgen.be/dm/nl/2909/tv/article/detail/1698101/2013/09/03/Lang-Leve-Lang-leve-Jonas-Van-Geel.dhtml
http://www.tv-visie.be/inhoud/belgie/jonas-van-geel-eert-jacques-vermeire-in-lang-leve_61728/

Belgian comedy television shows
Flemish television shows
2013 Belgian television series debuts
VTM (TV channel) original programming